Madzharovo Point (‘Nos Madzharovo’ \'nos ma-'dzha-ro-vo\) is a point on the southwest coast of Fournier Bay in Anvers Island in the Palmer Archipelago, Antarctica separating the termini of Thamyris Glacier to the northwest and Kleptuza Glacier to the southeast.

The point is named after the town of Madzharovo in southeastern Bulgaria.

Location
British mapping in 1980.

Maps
 British Antarctic Territory. Scale 1:200000 topographic map No. 3217. DOS 610 - W 64 62. Tolworth, UK, 1980.
 Antarctic Digital Database (ADD). Scale 1:250000 topographic map of Antarctica. Scientific Committee on Antarctic Research (SCAR). Since 1993, regularly upgraded and updated.

References
 Madzharovo Point. SCAR Composite Gazetteer of Antarctica.
 Bulgarian Antarctic Gazetteer. Antarctic Place-names Commission. (details in Bulgarian, basic data in English)

External links
 Madzharovo Point. Copernix satellite image

Headlands of the Palmer Archipelago
Bulgaria and the Antarctic